Elections to the National Assembly of France were held in Algeria on 14 October 1877 as part of the wider National Assembly elections. All three seats had only one candidate.

Results

See also
 1877 French legislative election

References

Elections in Algeria
1877
1877 in Algeria
1877 elections in Africa